The Kerry Senior Hurling Championship (known for sponsorship reasons as Garvey's SuperValu Senior Hurling Championship) is an annual hurling competition organised by the Kerry County Board of the Gaelic Athletic Association since 1889 for the top hurling teams in the county of Kerry in Ireland.

The series of games are played during the summer months, with the county final currently being played in Austin Stack Park in August. Initially played a knock-out competition, the championship currently uses a double elimination format whereby each team is guaranteed at least two games. The 2020 championship reverted to a straight knock-out format due to the Covid-19 pandemic.

The Kerry County Championship is an integral part of the wider Munster Intermediate Club Hurling Championship. The winners of the Kerry county final join the intermediate champions of the other five counties to contest the provincial championship.

The title has been won at least once by 21 different teams. The all-time record-holders are Kilmoyley who have won 26 titles.

Causeway are the current title-holders after defeating Ballyduff by 2-15 to 0-16 in the 2022 championship final played at Austin Stack Park in Tralee.

History

Beginnings
The inaugural championship took place in 1889 with just five clubs entering. These were Abbeydorney, Ballyduff, Kenmare, Kilgarvan and Kilmoyley. The very first championship match was held on 10 March 1889 when Abbeydorney beat Ballyduff by 1-1 to 0-1. Walkovers and delays were regular occurrences in the early years of the championship, while no records exist for some championship finals. More clubs fielded teams as the years went on, with the championships of 1905 and 1913 being held on a league basis.

The championship suffered severe disruption between 1920 and 1924 due to the War of Independence and subsequent Civil War. Several championships were abandoned midway through, while the championships of 1921 and 1923 were cancelled. The last championship which failed to be completed was in 1935.

Club dominance
Since the beginning, the championship has been dominated at various times by Ballyduff and Kilmoyley who are collectively known as the "big two". They have won 49 championship titles between them. Kilmoyley dominated the first 25 years of the championship, winning ten titles between 1890 and 1914. The 1920s and 1930s saw a number of first-time winners, including Austin Stacks, Causeway and Lixnaw. Crotta O'Neill's also won their first championship in 1939 and dominated the next twelve years by winning eight titles in total.

The second half of the 20th century was dominated by Ballyduff. The club won 19 championship titles in a forty-year period between 1955 and 1995. The only club who came close to matching their dominance was Causeway who won six championships between 1979 and 1987. The first two decades of the 21st century has seen the Kilmoyley-Ballyduff hegemony continue. Kilmoyley won their first title after a 30-year fallow period in 2001, before claiming seven more titles up to 2016. Ballyduff won five championships between 2006 and 2017. Kilmoyley won back to back titles in 2020-21 to give them ten titles in 20 years.

The 2022 final included a first, a live referee microphone for its national broadcast on TG4. It was also the first time the Kerry County Hurling Final was shown on live national TV.

Trophy
The Neilus Flynn Cup is presented to the winners of the championship and is named after Neilus Flynn, who captained Causeway and St Brendan's (Div.) to County Championship successes in 1932 and 1936 respectively. The Flynn family donated both the original trophy (in 1987) and the new cup to the Kerry County Board. The current trophy, which was designed by silversmith Fintan Foley, was presented for the first time to the 2018 champions, Lixnaw.

Roll of honour

Finals listed by year

Winning captains
1889: Lawrence Egan (Kenmare)
1890: Jack W. Quane (Kilmoyley)
1891: John O'Mahony (Ballyduff)
1892: Jack W. Quane (Kilmoyley)
1893: Davy Fitzgerald (Abbeydorney)
1894: John Gurnett (Kilmoyley)
1895: Jack W. Quane (Kilmoyley) 
1896: Davy Fitzgerald (Abbeydorney)
1897: John Ban McCarthy (Lixnaw)
1898: No Record
1899: No Record
1900: Patsy O'Rourke (Kilmoyley)
1901; Patsy O'Rourke (Kilmoley)
1902: George Maybury (Kenmare)
1903: Chris Horan (Tralee Celtic)
1904: Paddy Guerin (Tralee Celtic)
1905: Tim Meehan (Kilmoyley)
1906: No Record
1907: Pat Meehan (Kilmoyley)
1908: Dan Mullins (Tralee Mitchels)
1909: No Record
1910: Tim Meehan (Kilmoyley)
1911: Paddy O'Mahoney (Tralee Mitchels)
1912: Tom Costelleo (Tralee Mitchels)
1913: Maurice Treacy (Abbeydorney)
1914: Tim Meehan (Kilmoyley)
1915: No Record
1916: Willie Mangan (Tullig)
1917: Pat Carmody (Tubird) 
1918: John Dunne (Tralee Parnells)
1919: John Dunne (Tralee Parnells)
1920: No Record
1921: Not Held
1922: Not Finished
1923: Not Held
1924: Championship abandoned
1925: Jer "Pluggy" Moriarty (Tralee)
1926: No Record
1927: Not Held
1928: Joe Barrett (Rock Street)
1929: Dan Rayn (Rock Street)
1930: No Record
1931: Joe Barrett (Rock Street)
1932: Neilus Flynn (Causeway)
1933: Joe Barrett (Austin Stacks)
1934: Not Finished
1935: Not Played
1936: Neilus Flynn (St Brendan's, Ardfert)
1937: Willie Shanahan (Pearses)
1938: John Twomey (Pearses)
1939: Jimmy Flaherty (Crotta O'Neill's)
1940: Johnny Hussey (Banna)
1941: Jack Kenney (Crotta O'Neill's)
1942: Jerry McCarthy (Kenmare)
1943: Pat Ladie (Crotta O'Neill's)
1944: Jimmy Flaherty (Crotta O'Neill's)
1945: Jimmy Flaherty (Crotta O'Neill's)
1946: Christy O’Mahony (Ballyheigue)
1947: Jimmy Flaherty (Crotta O'Neill's)
1948: Mick McGrath (Kilmoyley)
1949: Frank Kissane (St Brendan's, Ardfert)
1950: Jimmy Flaherty (Crotta O'Neill's)
1951: Tom Nolan (Crotta O'Neill's)
1952: Johnny Hussey (St Brendan's, Ardfert)
1953: Richie Purcell (Kilgarvan)
1954: Jim Hogan (Lixnaw)
1955: Michael Hennessy (Ballyduff)
1956: Paudie Healy (Kilgarvan)
1957: Brendan Hennessy (Ballyduff)
1958: Denis Hegarty (Kilgarvan)
1959: Teddy Hennessy (Ballyduff)
1960: Stephen O'Sullivan (Ballyduff)
1961: Richie McCarthy (Ballyduff)
1962: Michael Curran (Kilmoyley)
1963: John Flanagan (Kilmoyley)
1964: Michael Regan (Kilmoyley)
1965: Mike Joe Quinlan (Ballyduff)
1966: Thomas Leen (Ballyduff)
1967: John O' Sullivan (St Brendan's, Ardfert)
1968: Tom Kenny (Crotta O'Neill's)
1969: Con O' Mara (Killarney)
1970: Patsy O'Connor (Kilmoyley)
1971: Mike Fitzgerald (Kilmoyley)
1972: Johnny Bunyan (Ballyduff)
1973: Pat Costello (Ballyduff)
1974: Tony Behan (Abbeydorney)
1975: James McGrath (St Brendan's, Ardfert)
1976: Eamonn O'Sullivan (Ballyduff)
1977: Liam Boyle (Ballyduff)
1978: Mike Carroll (Ballyduff)
1979: Roger Hussy (Causeway)
1980: Roy Dineen (Causeway)
1981: Maurice Leahy (Causeway)
1982: Gerald O'Grady (Causeway)
1983: Moss McKenna (Lixnaw)
1984: Tom O'Sullivan (Ballyduff)
1985: Moss Allen (Lixnaw)
1986: John Crowley (St Brendan's, Ardfert)
1987: Anthony O'Connor (Causeway)
1988: Tadgh O'Halloran (Ballyduff)
1989: John Hennessy (Ballyduff)
1990: Philip Stack (St Brendan's, Ardfert)
1991: Jimmy O'Sullivan (Ballyduff)
1992: Patrick O’Mahony (Ballyheigue)
1993: Liam Ross (Ballyduff)
1994: Noel Browne (Ballyduff)
1995: Christy Ross (Ballyduff)
1996: Patrick O’Mahony (Ballyheigue)
1997; Nicholas Roche (Ballyheigue)
1998: Maurice O'Carroll (Causeway)
1999: Trevor McKenna (Lixnaw)
2000: Michael ‘Boxer’ Slattery (Ballyheigue)
2001: James McCarthy (Kilmoyley)
2002: Ian Brick (Kilmoyley)
2003: Maurice Murnane (Kilmoyley)
2004: Shane Brick (Kilmoyley)
2005: Fergus Fitzmaurice (Lixnaw)
2006: David Slattery (Ballyduff)
2007: Patrick Dowling (Lixnaw)
2008: Tom Murnane (Kilmoyley)
2009: Micheal Regan (Kilmoyley)
2010: Padraig O'Grady (Ballyduff)
2011: Ally O'Connor (Ballyduff)
2012: Aidan Boyle (Ballyduff)
2013: Eamon Corridon (St Brendan's, Ardfert)
2014: Maurice Corridan (Lixnaw)
2015: Sean Maunsell (Kilmoyley)
2016: Aidan McCabe (Kilmoyley)
2017: Mikey Boyle (Ballyduff)
2018: Darragh Shanahan (Lixnaw)
2019: Muiris Delaney (Causeway)
2020: John B. O'Halloran (Kilmoyley)
2021: Florence McCarthy (Kilmoyley)
2022: Jason Diggins (Causeway)

Records and statistics

Teams

By decade
The most successful team of each decade, judged by number of Kerry Senior Hurling Championship titles, is as follows:
 1890s: 4 for Kilmoyley (1890-92-94-95)
 1900s: 4 for Kilmoyley (1900-01-05-07)
 1910s: 2 each for Kilmoyley (1910-14), Tralee Mitchels (1911-12) and Tralee Parnells (1918-19)
 1920s: 2 for Austin Stacks (as Rock Street) (1928-29)
 1930s: 2 for Kilflynn Pearses (1938-39)
 1940s: 5 for Crotta O'Neill's (1941-43-44-45-47)
 1950s: 3 each for Kilgarvan (1953-56-58) and Ballyduff (1955-57-59)
 1960s: 4 for Ballyduff (1960-61-65-66)
 1970s: 5 for Ballyduff (1972-73-76-77-78)
 1980s: 4 for Causeway (1980-81-82-87)
 1990s: 4 for Ballyduff (1991-93-94-95)
 2000s: 6 for Kilmoyley (2001-02-03-04-08-09)
 2010s: 4 for Ballyduff (2010-11-12-17)
 2020s: 2 for Kilmoyley (2020-21)

Gaps
Top fourteen longest gaps between successive championship titles:
 64 years: Ballyduff (1891-1955)
 61 years: Abbeydorney (1913-1974)
 54 years: Crotta O'Neill's (1968-present)
 48 years: Abbeydorney (1974-present)
 47 years: Causeway (1932-1979)
 46 years: Ballyheigue (1946-1992)
 40 years: Kenmare (1902-1942)
 34 years: Kilmoyley (1914-1948)
 30 years: Kilmoyley (1971-2001)
 29 years: Lixnaw (1954-1983)
 23 years: Ballyheigue (2000-present)
 23 years: St Brendan's, Ardfert (1990-2013)
 21 years: Causeway (1998-2019)
 20 years: Lixnaw (1934-1954)

References

 
1
Senior hurling county championships